Line 17 of the Shanghai Metro, formerly known as the Qingpu line, is an east-west rapid transit line that runs between  in Minhang District and  in Qingpu District. All stations are fully accessible. The line entered passenger trial operations on 30 December 2017.

It is the first metro line to primarily service the suburban Qingpu District. However, this station only services an area adjacent to the district's eastern border with Minhang. Line 17 is known for its artistic elements embedded into its stations. Due to the proximity of the line to various cultural and scenic attractions, specifically the ancient water town of Zhujiajiao and Dianshan Lake, the line's theme is water towns and headstreams of Shanghai. The line is colored light brown on system maps.

The line is the second line in Shanghai to use Shanghainese to announce stations. It is operated by Shanghai No. 2 Metro Operation Co. Ltd..

History 
During the line's planning stages, it was initially envisioned as a western extension of Line 2 and designated R2w. It also briefly took the designation of Line 20 before being officially renumbered to its current designation. Construction began in 2014 and track-laying was completed on 12 May 2017. The line debuted on 30 December 2017, when it opened for "soft" passenger trial operation.

Stations

Service routes

Important stations

The line then crosses into Qingpu District and traverses the length of the suburban district from east to west. West of Zhaoxiang, the line again enters an underground section until just west of Dianshanhu Avenue. In this underground section, the tracks follow East Yinggang Road westward, before curving south under Caoying Road, and then southwest again beneath Dianshanhu Avenue.

, the eastern terminus of the line, is the only station that provides an interchange to other lines in the network. At the station, passengers can interchange to lines 2 and 10 without leaving the fare-paid zone. A cross-platform interchange is provided for passengers between line 2 and line 17. Eastbound passengers on line 17 arriving at Hongqiao Railway Station can simply stay on the same platform, crossing the other side, to change to an eastbound line 2 train. Similarly, westbound passengers bound for  coming from line 2 can transfer to Line 17 by crossing to the other side of the platform. Transfers between line 10 and Line 17 require passengers to ascend to the station concourse and change platforms. The station is also directly connected to Hongqiao Railway Station, which provides inter-city high-speed travel to destinations throughout China.

Future Expansion

West extension to Xicen
An extension of one station to Xicen was drafted in December 2020. It will follow Qingping highway then G50 Shanghai–Chongqing Expressway. Construction started on 28 June 2021.

The west extension project of Line 17 will run from Oriental Land station (excluding) to Xicen Station, with a total length of about 6.6 kilometers, which will promote the Cenke Innovation Center.

Extension beyond Xicen
The first phase of the western extension of the line will be further expanded 13 kilometers to Xicen and Jinze towns, both with an abundance of lakes, wetlands and typical sceneries of watertowns in the southern areas of the Yangtze River Delta.

In the long term, Shanghai metro line 17 will in the future connect with line 10 of  Suzhou Rail Transit.
line 10 is expected to extend to Shuixiangketing Station, passing through Lili, and planning Jiaxing North Station within Jiashan Track branch to Xitang Station. The extension line of  Suzhou Rail Transit line 10 starts from the planned Suzhou South Station, passes through Lili Station, and ends at Shuixiangketing Station.

The planning suggests that Shanghai Line 17 extend to Jiashan South Station, passing through important nodes such as Jiashan Station, Xitang Station, and Shuixiangketing station. According to the publicized rail network layout plan, the extension of Shanghai Metro Line 17 departs from Shanghai Metro Oriental Land station, along with Dianshan Lake Station, Shuixiangketing Station, Beixiang Fudang Station, Xitang Station, Yaozhuang Station, and Tan Gongbei Road Station, Jiashan Station, Jiashan Stadium Station, High-speed Railway Xincheng Station, Jiashan South Station have 10 stations, connecting Pinghu in the long term.

Future link with Jiaxing Metro Line 3 is also under consideration.

Extension beyond Hongqiao Railway Station 
Changning District government has proposed plans to extend Line 17 to the Changning District.

Headways 
<onlyinclude>
<onlyinclude>

Technology

Signalling 
CASCO TRANAVI GoA3

Rolling Stock 
The line uses 28 6-carriages A-type trains built by Changchun Railway Vehicles or Shanghai Electric. Unlike most Shanghai Metro lines, this line is operated using third rail electrification. Trains have a capacity of about 1,860 people.

References

External links


Shanghai Metro lines
 
Railway lines opened in 2017
2017 establishments in China